Portland Seminary at George Fox University is a multi-denominational, university-based school that offers a variety of master's degree and postgraduate degree programs in theology and ministry, located in Portland, Oregon.

The Association of Theological Schools in the United States and Canada granted the seminary full accreditation in 1974. It remains a fully accredited member to present. The Northwest Commission on Colleges and Universities also certifies the seminary's programs.

Mission statement
Portland Seminary is Christ-centered, broadly-evangelical, and committed to equipping women and men holistically for local and global service.

Purpose statement
Portland Seminary exists to develop leaders and scholars to have a transformative and prophetic influence for Jesus Christ in the church and the world. We pursue this purpose by integrating spiritual formation, history, theology, and biblical and pastoral studies, in a multicultural and ecologically sensitive environment.

History

Founded in 1947 as the Western School of Evangelical Religion, the original campus was on the grounds of the Evangelical Church conference in Jennings Lodge, Oregon. In 1951 the school became Western Evangelical Seminary and in 1993 moved to a new campus near Interstate 5 and highways 99W and 217. In 1996, Western Evangelical Seminary merged with George Fox College to form George Fox University and changed its name to George Fox Evangelical Seminary in 2000. On January 9, 2017, the seminary changed its name to Portland Seminary.

The first students came from these founding denominations: the Evangelical Church of North America, Northwest Yearly Meeting of Friends, the Free Methodists, the Nazarenes, and the Church of God (Anderson, Indiana). Today, more than 35 denominations are represented in the student body.

Academics
Portland Seminary offers programs both in-person in Portland, Oregon and online:

In addition to the Master of Divinity, the foundational degree for pastoral ministry, Portland Seminary also offers an MA in Ministry (with a specialization), an MA in Theological Studies, and an MA in Spiritual Formation. The MA in Theological Studies, with emphases in Bible, Christian History and Theology, or Christian Earthkeeping, continues to serve those called to teaching or eventual doctoral study. The Doctor of Ministry degree, for experienced pastors who hold the M.Div. or its equivalent, is a cohort-style online program with three tracks: Semiotics, Church, and Culture; Leadership and Spiritual Formation; and Leadership and Global Perspectives.

Accreditation 
The M.Div., MA in Ministry, MA in Spiritual Formation, MA in Theological Studies, D.Min. and D.Ld degrees are approved by the Commission on Accrediting of the Association of Theological Schools in the United States and Canada. 

The Northwest Commission on Colleges and Universities also certifies the seminary's programs. This dual accreditation is maintained now through George Fox University and assures students of the highest academic and professional standards.    

Degrees
Doctor of Ministry Programs:
Leadership and Spiritual Formation with MaryKate Morse 
Semiotics, Church and Culture with Leonard Sweet
Doctor of Leadership Programs:
Leadership and Global Perspectives with Jason Swan Clark
Master of Divinity
Master of Arts in Theological Studies
Master of Arts in Intercultural Studies
Master of Arts in Ministry
Master of Arts in Spiritual Direction

Certificates
Spiritual Direction Certificate
Spiritual Direction Supervisor Certificate
Spiritual Formation and Discipleship Certificate

Awards and grants 
Portland Seminary offers several financial assistance programs for its degree-seeking students. These include: the Brose Scholarship; the Julius Clifton Bruner Scholarship Fund for graduate theological education, established by Iris J. Bruner in memory of her late husband; the Clapp Scholarship for M.Div. students; the Delamarter Scholarship, awarded to a Free Methodist student interested in Evangelism; the Farmer Family Scholarship; and the Ministry to Underserved Populations Scholarship, awarded to students who work in Oregon or South West Washington, serving unique underserved people groups. Among its other scholarships, the Seminary also offers the Hawks Ministerial Scholarship, the Ketterling-Schlenker Scholarship, the Clara and Harlan Macy Memorial Scholarship, the Chuan Cheng Morrisey Missions Memorial Scholarship Fund for students preparing for cross-cultural ministry, and the Richard Parker Scholarship, established by Jeannette Parker in memory of her husband.

Among its student prizes, Portland Seminary awards annual prizes for Excellence in Writing and Excellence in Preaching in honor of the American theologian and writer Frederick Buechner.

References

External links
George Fox University official site
Portland Seminary official site.

Seminaries and theological colleges in Oregon
Evangelical seminaries and theological colleges
Education in Portland, Oregon
Educational institutions established in 1947
George Fox University
1947 establishments in Oregon